Edward John Massey (2 July 1900 – 30 April 1977) was a rugby union scrum half who played 3 times for  in the 1925 Five Nations Championship.  He played his club rugby for Leicester Tigers and Liverpool.

Massey made his Leicester Tigers debut on New Years Day, 1923, against Headingley but featured intermittently for the rest of the season and the 1923–24 season.  In the 1924–25 he became a regular playing 25 games for the club and earning his international cap.

Massey is thought to be England's first Roman Catholic international.  He made his debut on 17 January 1925 against  at Twickenham in a 12-6 win.  He then featured in a draw against  and following a loss to  he was dropped and never selected again.  His last game for Leicester was the week before against Northampton Saints at Welford Road.

References

1900 births
1977 deaths
England international rugby union players
English rugby union players
Leicester Tigers players
People from West Derby
Rugby union players from Liverpool
Rugby union scrum-halves

Liverpool St Helens F.C. players